David Chambers (November 25, 1780 – August 8, 1864) was a United States Representative from Ohio.

Early life and career
Born in Allentown, Pennsylvania, Chambers was tutored by his father.  He served as a confidential express rider for President George Washington during the Whisky Insurrection in 1794.  Beginning in 1796, he learned the art of printing while working in a newspaper office under Benjamin Franklin Bache.  He moved to Zanesville, Ohio, in 1810, where he established a newspaper and was elected State printer.  During the War of 1812, he volunteered as an aide-de-camp to Major General Lewis Cass.
He served as recorder and mayor of Zanesville, and as a member of the Ohio House of Representatives in 1814, 1828, from 1836 to 1838, 1841, and 1842.
He served as clerk of the Ohio State Senate in 1817 and the court of common pleas of Muskingum County from 1817 to 1821.

Congress
Chambers was subsequently elected as a Democratic-Republican to the 17th United States Congress to fill the vacancy caused by the resignation of Representative-elect John C. Wright and served from October 9, 1821, to March 3, 1823.  He was not a candidate for renomination in the subsequent election.

Chambers was affiliated with the Whig Party after its formation in 1833.  He served as member of the State senate in 1843 and 1844, and as president of the senate in 1844.  In 1850, he served as delegate to the State constitutional convention of 1850.

He was active in agricultural pursuits until 1856.  On August 8, 1864, Chambers died in Zanesville, Ohio.  He was interred in Greenwood Cemetery.

Sources

1780 births
1864 deaths
Members of the Ohio House of Representatives
Politicians from Zanesville, Ohio
Ohio Whigs
Presidents of the Ohio State Senate
Mayors of places in Ohio
Ohio Constitutional Convention (1850)
American military personnel of the War of 1812
Democratic-Republican Party members of the United States House of Representatives from Ohio
19th-century American politicians